A halo antenna, or halo, is a center-fed  dipole antenna, which has been bent into a circle, with a break directly opposite the feed point. The dipole ends are close, but do not touch, and may be widened to form an air capacitor, whose spacing is used to adjust the antenna's resonant frequency. Most often mounted horizontally, this antenna's radiation is then approximately omnidirectional and horizontally polarized.

Halo antennas vs. loop antennas
This section contrasts halo antennas with loop antennas which are electrically dissimilar, but can be confused as they all share the same circular shape.

Halo vs. large loops

Although also a resonant antenna, the halo antenna is distinct from the full-wave loop antenna, which is approximately double its size for the same operating frequency. In the case of the halo antenna, each half is about a quarter wavelength long and ends with a current node (zero current and peak voltage) at the break. On the other hand, the two semi-circles of a resonant loop, each being a half wavelength long, end with a voltage node (peak current and zero voltage) opposite the feedpoint, where the semi-circles are connected.

In the diagram (left) the square full wave loop has maximum signal broadside to the square wires, with nulls off the left and right sides; the octagonal small loop has maximum signal (magenta) within the plane of its wires, with nulls (black center point) broadside to them.
Self-resonant loops with a perimeter of one full wavelength have a radiation pattern which peaks perpendicular to the plane of the loop (along the  axis, in the diagram below) but falls to zero within the plane of the loop, quite opposite the radiation pattern of a halo antenna. Thus, despite the superficial similarity, these two antenna types behave fundamentally differently.

Halo vs. small loops
A halo antenna is distinct from the small-loop antenna in size,
radiation resistance, and efficiency, however their radiation patterns are nearly the same. A halo antenna is a self-resonant antenna: Its feedpoint impedance is purely resistive at the design frequency. A small loop antenna, on the other hand, has lower radiation resistance
and is not self-resonant; it requires some form of impedance matching to counter the loop's reactance – in practice, this usually consists of a variable capacitor bridging the point corresponding to the gap of a halo.

The distribution of current along the two arms of a halo antenna is similar to the currents along the two arms (also a quarter wavelength long) of a half-wave dipole (see the animation there), being largest at the feedpoint and dropping to zero at the ends (the gap in the case of the halo). On the other hand, a small loop has a current which is approximately uniform and in‑phase along the conductor. The halo – again like the half-wave dipole – also has voltage peaks at the gap, whereas it is the larger current near the feedpoint most responsible for the radiation produced, with the antenna radiating slightly more towards the split in the loop. The small loop radiates nearly equally in all directions within the plane of the conductor.

Both the halo and small loops' radiation patterns are opposite that of the full-wave loop, being maximum in the plane of the loop, rather than perpendicular to it; halo antennas radiate only a small amount perpendicular to the loop plane, and small loops have no perpendicular radiation at all ("null").

Halos are most often oriented with the plane of the loop aligned horizontally, parallel to the ground, in order to effect an approximately omnidirectional radiation pattern in the horizontal plane and minimize wasteful vertical radiation. Small loops, on the other hand, are often oriented vertically, to take advantage of the small loop's "null" reception by pointing their "deaf" direction (perpendicular to the loop plane) towards a source of interference.

Mistaken understanding of the halo's gap 
Although some writers consider the gap in the halo antenna's loop to distinguish it from a small loop antenna – since there is no DC connection between the two ends – that distinction is lost at RF: The close-bent high-voltage ends are connected capacitively, with a RF electrical connection completed through displacement current. Despite the abrupt reversal in voltage across the gap, the RF current bridging the gap is continuous (although possibly momentarily zero).

The gap in the halo is electrically equivalent to the tuning capacitor on a small loop, although its stray capacitance is not nearly as large as needed for a magnetic loop: Capacitance is not needed since the halo antenna is already resonant, but since some small capacitive coupling is present anyway, the arms of the dipole are trimmed back from 97% of a quarter-wave each to restore resonance. Moreover, the halo ends are often pressed even closer together, to increase their mutual capacitance and the ends then cut even shorter to compensate, in order to make the radiation pattern even more nearly omnidirectional, and to produce even less wasteful vertical radiation (for a horizontally mounted halo).

Modern vs. original halo designs
Early halo antennas used two or more parallel loops, modeled after a 1943 patent which was a folded dipole bent into a circle.

The double loop design can be extended to multiple, stacked electrically parallel loops. Each additional loop increases the radiation resistance by the square of the number of turns, which broadens the SWR bandwidth, increases radiation efficiency, and up to a point, helps with impedance matching.

More recent halo antennas have tended to use a single turn loop, fed with a one-armed gamma match.
The newer approach uses less material and reduces wind load, but has narrower bandwidth, may be mechanically less robust, and usually requires a current balun to inhibit feed-line radiation.

Advantages and disadvantages of a halo antennas
Like all antenna designs, the halo antenna is a compromise that sacrifices one desirable quality for another even more desirable quality – for example halos are small and moderately efficient, but only for a single frequency and a narrow band around it. The following sections discuss the advantages and disadvantages of halo antennas both for practical and theoretical issues.

Advantages

 The halo is a larger antenna, and consequently is more efficient than a small loop, and roughly the same efficiency as a dipole antenna cut for the same frequency.

 On the VHF bands and above, the physical diameter of a halo is small enough to be effectively used as a mobile antenna.

 Towards the horizon, the pattern is omnidirectional to within 3 dB or less, and that can be evened out by making the loop slightly smaller and adding more capacitance between the element tips. Not only will that even out the gain, it will reduce the largely-wasted upward radiation.

 When either fed with a gamma match, or mounted with the loops' neutral point on a conducting mast, the radiating element of the halo is at DC ground, which tends to reduce buildup of noisy static.

 Halos pick up less ignition noise from engines when mounted atop vehicle roofs than whip antennas.

 Halos may be stacked for additional gain and increased efficiency. This reduces the high angle radiation, but has little or no effect on the shape of the radiation pattern in the plane of the antenna.

 A well-constructed halo presents a good match to 50 ohm coaxial cable.

Disadvantages
 Radiation from horizontal halos has almost no vertical polarization component. One can expect a large signal loss when the other station uses vertical polarization.

 The halo antenna is structurally rigid; if attached to a vehicle, it may suffer damage from tree branches or other obstacles, unlike a whip antenna which bends and springs back.

 A halo antenna is a resonant antenna, providing best performance only around one frequency. On the other hand, a small transmitting loop can be tuned over a 3:1 frequency range with a variable capacitor.

 For mobile use, the halo is rather conspicuous compared to the much more common vertical whip antenna, and may attract unwanted attention.

 A single-loop halo antenna is not as efficient for skywave communications as a horizontal small loop, other things being equal, since more of its signal is sent upward instead of outward, wasting signal power "warming the clouds".

Notes

References

External links 
 

 

Antennas (radio)